The Sultan of Selangor's Cup is an annual friendly football competition contested between two rival football clubs, Selangor and Singapore.

History
The Sultan of Selangor Cup is founded by the current Sultan of Selangor, His Royal Highness Sultan Sharafuddin Idris Shah in 2001 to strengthen the ties between two rival teams, Selangor FA and Singapore and to rekindle their rivalry after Singapore pulled out of the Malaysian League in 1994. The rivalry between two teams are very intense because of their status as the two most successful clubs in Malaysian football history and matches between the two sides has even been dubbed as the Malayan El'Clasico.

Past tournaments/winners

Source:

Performances

By team

See also
 Malayan El'Clasico
 Malaysia Cup
 Piala FA
 Piala Sumbangsih
 History of Malaysian football

References 

 
Recurring sporting events established in 2001
Selangor FA
Singapore national football team
Football cup competitions in Malaysia